Immigration to Russia involves foreign citizens seeking permanent residence in the territory of the Russian Federation. The standard immigration procedure consists of the following steps: obtaining a temporary residence permit; obtaining a permanent residence permit and obtaining Russian citizenship. Under current law, one can receive citizenship of Russia after five years of residence and after passing an exam in Russian language. Immigration to Russia is regulated by the Main Directorate for Migration Affairs. Immigration plays an important role in modern Russian demographic processes, accounting for the increase in the population from 2011.

Russia maintains one of the world's most liberal immigration policies; anyone who works in Russia for five years and develops fluency in the Russian language can become a citizen, provided they have not committed a crime. Almost anyone who is hired by a Russian firm can stay in the country and work indefinitely  This reflects a policy change, in response to declining birth rates, on the part of the government of Vladimir Putin from the more restrictive policy enacted after the 1991 dissolution of the Soviet Union. The large non-Slavic immigrant populations arriving in response to Putin's liberal policy have sometimes encountered xenophobia. To counter this, pursuant to Russian hate-speech laws, the Russian state has shut down various anti-immigrant groups, such as the Movement Against Illegal Immigration.

Russian-language native-speakers, those married to Russian citizens, highly-qualified specialists, businessmen and refugees are eligible for a simplified immigration procedure. It allows gaining citizenship in 3 years (instead of 5 under the standard procedure) or sometimes skipping temporary or permanent residency.

Statistics

Recent trends

Foreign population
As of May 2022, there are 5.99 million foreigners residing in the Russian Federation (up from 5.66 million in 2021 but down from 10.13 million in 2019), with the vast majority (91%) being citizens of CIS countries. Central Asians make up the most numerous group, followed by Ukrainian citizens. Temporary migration from Uzbekistan, Tajikistan and Kyrgyzstan increased after a marked decline in 2020-2021. Other CIS countries have steadily demonstrated a decrease in the number of migrants.

According to the Ministry of Internal Affairs, as of November 2021, there were 5.5 million migrants in Russia. Of these, 819,600 were in the country illegally. In the first quarter of 2021, 1345 migrants were deported, more than in the same period last year. The number of deported migrants increased in Russia.
 
Foreign residents from the CIS in Russia:

See also
 Demographics of Russia
 Illegal immigration to Russia

References

 
Labor in Russia